Peñón de Algámitas is a mountain located in the Province of Seville, Andalusia, Spain, with a height of 1121 meters above sea level. It is located in the municipality of Algámitas, having border El Terril with both mountains belonging to the Sierra del Tablon.

References 

Mountains of Andalusia
Geography of the Province of Seville